Sarxanlı or Sarıxanlı or Sərxanlı may refer to:

Sarxanlı, Azerbaijan
Sərxanlı, Azerbaijan
Sarıxanlı, Azerbaijan